Reinhard is a German, Austrian, Danish, and to a lesser extent Norwegian surname (from Germanic ragin, counsel, and hart, strong), and a spelling variant of Reinhardt.

Persons with the given name
Reinhard of Blankenburg (after 1107 – 1123), German bishop
Reinhard Böhler (1945–1995), German sidecarcross racer
Reinhard Bonnke (1940–2019), German evangelist
Rainhard Fendrich (born 1955), Austrian singer
Reinhard Gehlen (1902–1979), German spymaster
Reinhard Heydrich (1904–1942), German Nazi leader
Reinhard Mey (born 1942), German singer
Reinhard Mohn (1921–2009), German media tycoon
Reinhard Odendaal (born 1980), South African award-winning winemaker
Reinhard Scheer (1863–1928), German admiral
Reinhard Selten (1930–2016), German economist
Reinhard Strohm (born 1942), German musicologist
Reinhard Stupperich (born 1951), German classical archaeologist
Reinhard Wendemuth (born 1948), German rower

Persons with the surname
Blaire Reinhard, American musician
Bob Reinhard (1920–1996), American football player
Charles-Frédéric Reinhard (1761–1837), French diplomat and politician
Christopher Reinhard (born 1985), German football (soccer) player
Franz Volkmar Reinhard (1753–1812), German theologian
Johan Reinhard (born 1943), American mountaineer and archaeologist
Kurt Reinhard (1914–1979), German ethnomusicologist and composer
Kurt Reinhard, Austrian Righteous among the Nations
Wilhelm Reinhard (pilot) (1891-1918), German flying ace
Reinhardt family, sometimes spelled Reinhard, Austrian family of musicians that flourished in the 18th and 19th centuries

Fictional characters
Reinhard von Lohengramm, a character in the anime series Legend of the Galactic Heroes
Reinhard van Astrea, a character in the light novel series Re:Zero − Starting Life in Another World

See also
 Reinhart
 Reinhardt (disambiguation)
 Rinehart (disambiguation)
 Reynard (disambiguation)
 Reindert
 Operation Reinhard

German-language surnames
German masculine given names

Surnames from given names